Wüstenfelde is a railway station in the village of Wüstenfelde, Mecklenburg-Vorpommern, Germany. The station lies on the Angermünde-Stralsund railway and the train services are operated by Ostdeutsche Eisenbahn (ODEG).

Train services
The station is served by the following service:
Local services  Stralsund - Greifswald - Züssow

References

Railway stations in Mecklenburg-Western Pomerania
Railway stations in Germany opened in 1881